Christopher John Luongo (born March 17, 1967) is an American ice hockey coach and former ice hockey player. Luongo played in the National Hockey League (NHL) for the Detroit Red Wings, Ottawa Senators, and New York Islanders between 1991 and 1996. The rest of his career, which lasted from 1989 to 2004, was spent in various minor leagues, and then several years in the Deutsche Eishockey Liga. Internationally Luongo played for the American national team at three World Championships. After retiring from playing, Luongo turned to coaching, and has spent several years as an assistant coach at the American collegiate level.

Biography
Luongo was born in Detroit, Michigan, and grew up in Fraser, Michigan. As a youth, he played in the 1980 Quebec International Pee-Wee Hockey Tournament with the Detroit Compuware minor ice hockey team.

Luongo was a stay-at-home defenseman who played in 218 games in his NHL career, scoring 8 goals and 23 assists for 31 points and collecting 176 penalty minutes. Drafted by his hometown Red Wings in 1985, he then accepted a scholarship to Michigan State where he enjoyed a four-year career with the Spartans, earning the team's "Dr. John Downs Outstanding Defensive Player Award" in 1988 and 1989. He spent 1989 to 1992 in the Red Wings organization before signing with the Ottawa Senators as a free agent. After one season in Ottawa, he was traded to the New York Islanders, where he finished his NHL career in 1996.

Luongo was also a member of the U.S. squad at the 1996, 1997, and 2000 World Championships, winning the bronze medal in 1996.

From 1997 to 2004, Luongo played in Germany's Deutsche Eishockey Liga, playing for EV Landshut, Munich Barons, Nuremberg Ice Tigers and the Krefeld Pinguine.

Luongo currently resides in Novi, Michigan, and his two sons, Anthony and Christopher. He also has a dog named Tyson.

Coaching
Luongo spent two seasons as an assistant coach with the Wayne State Warriors. In September 2008 he joined the UAH Chargers as an assistant coach under head coach Danton Cole, who was a teammate of Luongo's at Michigan State. In 2010, he was named head coach of the Chargers, and coached the team for two seasons. After leaving UAH in 2012, he took a break from coaching until joining the National Team Development Program from 2015 to 2017 as assistant coach. Since 2017, Luongo has served as the assistant coach for the Michigan State men's hockey team under Cole.

Career statistics

Regular season and playoffs

International

Head coaching record

Awards and honors

References

External links 
 

1967 births
Living people
Alabama–Huntsville Chargers men's ice hockey coaches
American men's ice hockey defensemen
Denver Grizzlies players
Detroit Red Wings draft picks
Detroit Red Wings players
Detroit Vipers players
EV Landshut players
Ice hockey coaches from Michigan
Ice hockey players from Michigan
Krefeld Pinguine players
Michigan State Spartans men's ice hockey players
Milwaukee Admirals (IHL) players
München Barons players
NCAA men's ice hockey national champions
New Haven Senators players
New York Islanders players
Nürnberg Ice Tigers players
Ottawa Senators players
People from Fraser, Michigan
People from Novi, Michigan
Phoenix Roadrunners (IHL) players
Salt Lake Golden Eagles (IHL) players
Sportspeople from Metro Detroit